Gregory G. "Greg" Rose (born July 15, 1955, in Sydney, Australia) was a senior vice president of technology for Qualcomm. 

Rose is noted for designing the SOBER family of stream ciphers for wireless telephony. Together with Philip Hawkes, he also designed Turing, a cipher system based on the SOBER-t32. It was developed to address encryption issues, particularly the limitations to processing power, program space, and memory present in software encryption algorithms.

Selected publications
"Exploiting Multiples of the Connection Polynomial in Word-Oriented Stream Ciphers"

References

External links
Home page
Association for Computing Machinery publication profile
 List of publications from the DBLP Bibliography Server -  Gregory G. Rose

1955 births
Living people
Australian cryptographers
American cryptographers
20th-century American businesspeople
Australian emigrants to the United States